50th Birthday Celebration Volume 10 is a live album of improvised music by Yamataka Eye and John Zorn documenting their performance at Tonic in September 2003 as part of John Zorn's month-long 50th Birthday Celebration concert series. Guitarist Fred Frith also appears on one track.

Reception
The Allmusic listing rated the album 3½ stars. Pitchfork reviewer Cameron Macdonald gave the album 7.1 out of 10 stating "Listening to their new work was masochistic for me. High-pitched tones disturb me, and Zorn cleared my sinuses with one of the more horrific squeals caught live on tape in the 50th Birthday closer."

The authors of The Penguin Guide to Jazz called the album "mysterious", and wrote: "credit should be given to technician Sawai Taeji, who does quite extraordinary things with Eye's electronics: we have never heard a performance quite like it, and it is nothing like the screamfest which might have been expected."

Track listing

Personnel
 John Zorn – alto saxophone
 Yamataka Eye – voice, electronics
 Fred Frith – guitar (track 5)
 Sawai Taeji – technician

References

Albums produced by John Zorn
John Zorn live albums
2005 live albums
Tzadik Records live albums